The following list includes notable people who were born or have lived in Davenport, Iowa.

Fine arts and music 

 Bix Beiderbecke, jazz musician; the Bix 7 Road Race and Memorial Jazz Festival are named for him
 Isabel Bloom, sculpture artist; raised in Davenport
 Branden Campbell, bassist for Neon Trees; born in Davenport
Julia Michaels, singer-songwriter; born in Davenport

Media 

 Matthew Ashford, actor (Jack Deveraux on Days of Our Lives)
 Lara Flynn Boyle, actress (Twin Peaks and The Practice)
 Louise Carver, silent film and stage actress
 Dana Davis, actress (Franklin & Bash and 10 Things I Hate About You)
 Joe Frisco, jazz dancer and performer in vaudeville
 John Getz, stage and film actor (Blood Simple, Zodiac)
 Hazel Keener, silent-film actress
 Perry Lafferty, executive TV producer (All in the Family, M*A*S*H, and The Mary Tyler Moore Show)
 Sue Lyon, actress (Lolita)
 Stuart Margolin, actor and director (The Rockford Files)
 Vanessa McNeal, activist
 Mary Beth Peil, actress and singer (The Good Wife)
 Roger Perry, actor (Harrigan and Son)
 James Philbrook, actor (The Thin Red Line)
 Linnea Quigley, actress, known as a B movie scream queen
 Robin Thede, comedian, writer and actress; lived here as a child; first African-American woman host of a late-night TV talk show, The Rundown
 Hynden Walch, voice actress

Politics 

 Lyda Krewson, Mayor of St. Louis, Missouri
 Jim Leach, U.S. congressman; chairperson of National Endowment for the Humanities
 Larry Leonard, Illinois state senator
 Hiram Price, U.S. congressman
 Phyllis Thede, Iowa state representative since 2009
 Anthony Van Wyck, Wisconsin state senator
 Jarvis White, Wisconsin state assemblyman

Professional 

 Frederick G. Clausen, architect 
 Samuel Cody, aviation pioneer; native of Davenport
 Edward Hammatt, architect 
 Daniel David Palmer, founder of chiropractic
 Oran Pape, first Iowa state patrolman murdered in the line of duty
 Otto Frederick Rohwedder, inventor of mass-produced sliced bread; grew up in Davenport
 James A. Skinner, Executive Chairman of Walgreens Boots Alliance, and former CEO and Vice President of McDonald's; graduated from West High School (1962)

Religion 

 Ambrose Burke, priest and eighth president of Saint Ambrose University
 Martin Cone, priest and sixth president of Saint Ambrose University
 John Flannagan, priest and second president of Saint Ambrose University
 Mary Porter Gamewell (1848-1906), American missionary to China
 Gail Karp, cantor of Temple Emanuel
 Cletus Madsen, priest
 Carl Meinberg, priest and seventh president of Saint Ambrose University
 Sebastian Menke, priest and tenth president of Saint Ambrose University
 Marvin Mottet, priest
 Gerald Francis O'Keefe, bishop of the Diocese of Davenport

Sports 

 Gene Baker, infielder for Chicago Cubs and Pittsburgh Pirates
 Mike Busch, infielder for Los Angeles Dodgers
 Mike Butcher, pitcher for California Angels, coach for Arizona Diamondbacks
 Ed Conroy, college basketball head coach
 Roger Craig, running back for San Francisco 49ers, Los Angeles Raiders, and Minnesota Vikings
 Ricky Davis, basketball shooting guard for multiple NBA teams
 Justin Diercks, driver with NASCAR
 Greg Engel, center for San Diego Chargers and Detroit Lions
 Bill Fitch, two-time NBA Coach of the Year
 Dana Holgorsen, head coach of the University of Houston football team
 Austin Howard, offensive tackle for Oakland Raiders
 James Jones, defensive tackle for multiple NFL teams
 Josh Kroeger, outfielder for Arizona Diamondbacks
 Elmer Layden, fullback for three NFL teams, Notre Dame coach, College Football Hall of Famer
 Colby Lopez, professional wrestler known as Seth "Freaking"  Rollins in WWE
 Pat Miletich, mixed martial artist, inaugural UFC welterweight champion
 Michael Nunn, middleweight boxing champion; born in Davenport
 Nat Pendleton, Olympic wrestler (silver medalist); actor
 Scott Pose, outfielder for Florida Marlins, New York Yankees, and Kansas City Royals
 Rebecca Quin, professional wrestler known as Becky Lynch in WWE
 Kenny Shedd, wide receiver for multiple NFL teams, including Oakland Raiders
 Bob Stull, football head coach, University of Missouri and UTEP Miners football

Writing 

 Alice Braunlich (1888–1989), classical philologist; taught at Shimer and Goucher colleges
 George Cram Cook, novelist, poet, and playwright
 Lillien Blanche Fearing (1863–1901), American lawyer and poet
 Susan Glaspell, writer, Pulitzer Prize-winning playwright
 Charles Edward Russell (1860–1941), muckraking journalist; co-founder of the NAACP; 1927 Pulitzer Prize winner

References 

Davenport
Davenport